Stanislav Prychynenko (born 26 June 1991) is a Ukrainian former football defender. He also holds Russian citizenship as Stanislav Vladimirovich Prichinenko.

Club career
Prychynenko began his playing career with SC Tavriya Simferopol's youth team. Then he spent some years in FC Shakhtar Donetsk football system. In February 2011 he signed two years deal with SC Tavriya.

Following a 6-month loan from FC Tosno, on 8 June 2017 he signed a 2-year contract with FC Baltika Kaliningrad.

International career 
He played some matches for Ukraine national youth football teams of different ages.

Personal 
His father Volodymyr Prychynenko, his uncle Serhiy Prychynenko and cousin Denis Prychynenko (Serhiy's son) all played football professionally.

References

External links 

1991 births
Living people
Ukrainian footballers
Ukraine youth international footballers
Ukraine under-21 international footballers
Association football midfielders
Sportspeople from Simferopol
FC Shakhtar Donetsk players
FC Shakhtar-3 Donetsk players
SC Tavriya Simferopol players
Ukrainian Premier League players
Ukrainian Second League players
Russian First League players
Ukrainian expatriate footballers
Expatriate footballers in Russia
FC Tosno players
Ukrainian expatriate sportspeople in Russia
Naturalised citizens of Russia
Russian footballers
FC Baltika Kaliningrad players
FC Kolkheti-1913 Poti players
Expatriate footballers in Georgia (country)
Ukrainian expatriate sportspeople in Georgia (country)
Erovnuli Liga players
FC Akron Tolyatti players